The Fleeing of a Two-Legged Bookcase Live Album is the first concert live album by William Wei. Wei held his first major concert on September 18, 2010 at the Taipei International Convention Center, which was recorded for this live release. The 2-CD album contains 23 tracks from the live set, including songs from Wei's debut album as well as three previously unreleased songs: 'Why Life' (外·賴), 'She'll be an Angel', 'Me, a Pig, and His Girlfriend' (我 一只豬 和他的女朋友). Besides, he also covered some of his all-time pop favorites, including famous numbers of A-mei, Khalil Fong, James Blunt, and Maroon 5. The album was released on 3 June 2011, by Linfair Records.

Track listing

Music videos

References

2011 live albums
William Wei albums